Quiateot is the name of a rain deity in the mythological traditions of the pre-Columbian and contact-era Nicarao people, an indigenous grouping on the periphery of the Mesoamerican cultural area, located in present-day Nicaragua.

His father and mother are the supreme deities Omeyateite and Omeyatecigoat, respectively.

References

External links
http://www.sacred-texts.com/astro/ml/ml14.htm

Rain deities
Mesoamerican deities